Duhigg is a surname. Notable people with the surname include:

Bartholomew Thomas Duhigg (1750?–1813), Irish legal antiquary
Charles Duhigg (born 1974), American journalist and non-fiction author
Katy Duhigg, American attorney and politician